The House at 418 Blanca Avenue is a historic home in Tampa, Florida. It is located at 418 Blanca Avenue. On August 3, 1989, it was added to the U.S. National Register of Historic Places.

References and external links
 Hillsborough County listings at National Register of Historic Places

Houses in Tampa, Florida
History of Tampa, Florida
Houses on the National Register of Historic Places in Hillsborough County, Florida
Mediterranean Revival architecture of Davis Islands, Tampa, Florida
1928 establishments in Florida